Tengku Puteri Raja Tengku Puteri Iman Afzan binti Al-Sultan Abdullah Ri'ayatuddin Al-Mustafa Billah Shah (born 11 November 1992) is a Malaysian mental health activist and princess. She is the eldest daughter of Abdullah of Pahang, the 6th Sultan of Pahang and 16th Yang di-Pertuan Agong (King) of Malaysia. She serves as the royal patron of the J’keb Foundation and the National Coalition for Mental Wellbeing. Tengku Iman was appointed by the World Health Organization to serve as the International Patron of World Mental Health Day in 2020.

Early life 
Tengku Iman was born at Pantai Hospital in Kuala Lumpur on 11 November 1992. She is the daughter of Abdullah of Pahang, the 6th Sultan of Pahang and 16th Yang di-Pertuan Agong, and his second wife Julia Rais, a former actress and model. She is of British descent and Malay descent. She is Sultan Abdullah's oldest daughter and the oldest child from his second marriage.

She attended the University of Nottingham in England where she studied political science.

Activism and patronages 
On 18 September 2019, Tengku Iman accepted her appointment as the patron of the J’keb Foundation, which provides support for underprivileged teenagers and runs a transition home for aged-out orphans that are required to leave orphanages when they turn eighteen.

Tengku Iman served as Malaysia's Royal Patron of the Mental Illness Awareness and Support Association from 2018 to 2020. She was named as the International Patron of World Mental Health Day in 2020 by the World Health Organization following a recommendation made by the World Federation for Mental Health. Her term as international patron will end in October 2021. She is also one of the jurors on the My Mind On Film Festival Competition. 

On 10 September 2020, World Suicide Prevention Day, Tengku Iman called for reform to suicide legislation in Malaysia, urging the federal government to decriminalize suicide in order to end the stigmatization of mental health, while speaking at the launch of the Mental Illness Awareness and Support Association's new crisis management centre at the Orchid Clubhouse in Petaling Jaya. She stated that criminalizing suicide does not address the underlying factors and does not help reduce the number of suicides committed in Malaysia. Tengku Iman went on to say that the current laws discourage people suffering with mental illnesses to seek help and treatment. Elaborating on Malaysia's efforts to manage the COVID-19 pandemic, she said she was certain that the country's public health standards should include mental healthcare.

On 10 October 2020, she was joined by her father and her stepmother, Tunku Azizah Aminah Maimunah Iskandariah, in wearing green ribbons to show support for World Mental Health Day.

On 5 November 2020, Tengku Iman hosted a virtual meeting via Zoom Video Communications with students at HELP University and abroad in the United Kingdom to discuss mental health at universities. She addressed additional strains on mental health due to the COVID-19 pandemic, causing isolation from friends and family, and offered solutions to support good mental health.

On 10 December 2020, she was appointed as the Royal Patron of the National Coalition for Mental Wellbeing. She co-founded her own platform called the Green Ribbon Group which aims to push forward the mental health agenda and de-stigmatise mental illnesses in Malaysia. In 2020, in recommendation by the World Federation for Mental Health, she was named International Patron of World Mental Health Day by the World Health Organisation.

Marriage and issue 
On 4 August 2018, Tengku Iman married Tengku Abu Bakar Ahmad Tengku Arif Bendahara Tengku Abdullah. She is a first cousin-once removed of her husband, who is a nephew of her grandfather, Ahmad Shah of Pahang.

On 23 July 2019, Tengku Iman gave birth to a son, Tengku Zayn Edin Shah. On 2 February 2022, she gave birth to a daughter, Tengku Aleya Norlini.

Personal life 
Tengku Iman suffered from an anxiety disorder when she was a teenager. She is a practitioner of Sunni Islam and considers herself "spiritual".

Honours

For her role as an inspirational, purpose-driven leader committed to championing mental health in Malaysia and beyond, the  Heriot-Watt University Malaysia awarded her an honorary degree of “Doctor of the University”.

  :
  Grand Knight of the Order of Sultan Ahmad Shah of Pahang (SSAP) — Dato' Sri (2020)

References 

Living people
1992 births
Malaysian people of Malay descent
Malaysian Muslims
Malaysian people of British descent
Malaysian women activists
Mental health activists
People from Kuala Lumpur
Royal House of Pahang
Alumni of the University of Nottingham
Daughters of monarchs